Jann Castor (27 June 1954 – 21 April 2016), sometimes spelt Jan Castor, was a Polish Australian musician and composer. His soundtrack album for the tv series Red Express was nominated for the 1992 ARIA Award for Best Original Cast or Show Album.

Castor was born as Wiesław Ruciński in Włocławek, Poland. In the late 70s he established the band Res Publica which later morphed into Republika. In 1981 he moved to Australia and took on the Castor moniker. He continued working as a musician and became a film composer with credits including Kiss of Death (1997), Maniacts (2001), Asylum Days (2001), Four Nights with Anna (2008)  and 11 Minutes (2015).

Discography
"You’re Gotta Go" (1981) – Tonpress
Precedence (1990) – BMG
Red Express (1991) – BMG
Vitamins for the Soul (2009) – Motion Man

Jon Anderson and Jann Castor
Unbroken Spirit (2000)

Awards and nominations

ARIA Music Awards
The ARIA Music Awards is an annual awards ceremony that recognises excellence, innovation, and achievement across all genres of Australian music. They commenced in 1987. 

! 
|-
| 1992
| Red Express
| Best Original Soundtrack, Cast or Show Album
| 
| 
|-

References

External links
Official website

Polish musicians
Australian musicians
2016 deaths
1954 births
Polish emigrants to Australia